In Euclidean geometry, the Fermat point of a triangle, also called the Torricelli point or Fermat–Torricelli point, is a point such that the sum of the three distances from each of the three vertices of the triangle to the point is the smallest possible or, equivalently, the geometric median of the three vertices. It is so named because this problem was first raised by Fermat in a private letter to Evangelista Torricelli, who solved it.

The Fermat point gives a solution to the geometric median and Steiner tree problems for three points.

Construction 
The Fermat point of a triangle with largest angle at most 120° is simply its first isogonic center or X(13), which is constructed as follows:

 Construct an equilateral triangle on each of two arbitrarily chosen sides of the given triangle.
 Draw a line from each new vertex to the opposite vertex of the original triangle.
 The two lines intersect at the Fermat point.
An alternative method is the following:
 On each of two arbitrarily chosen sides, construct an isosceles triangle, with base the side in question, 30-degree angles at the base, and the third vertex of each isosceles triangle lying outside the original triangle.
 For each isosceles triangle draw a circle, in each case with center on the new vertex of the isosceles triangle and with radius equal to each of the two new sides of that isosceles triangle.
 The intersection inside the original triangle between the two circles is the Fermat point.

When a triangle has an angle greater than 120°, the Fermat point is sited at the obtuse-angled vertex.

In what follows "Case 1" means the triangle has an angle exceeding 120°. "Case 2" means no angle of the triangle exceeds 120°.

Location of X(13)

Fig. 2 shows the equilateral triangles  attached to the sides of the arbitrary triangle .
Here is a proof using properties of concyclic points to show that the three lines  in Fig 2 all intersect at the point  and cut one another at angles of 60°.

By the converse of the inscribed angle theorem applied to the segment , the points  are concyclic (they lie on a circle). Similarly, the points  are concyclic.

, so , using the  inscribed angle theorem.  Similarly, .

So .  Therefore, .  Using the inscribed angle theorem, this implies that the points  are concyclic. So, using the inscribed angle theorem applied to the segment , . Because , the point  lies on the line segment .  So, the lines  are  concurrent (they intersect at a single point).   Q.E.D.

However it is easily modified to cover Case 1. Then  hence  which means  is concyclic so .

The lines joining the centers of the circles in Fig. 2 are perpendicular to the line segments .  For example, the line joining the center of the circle containing  and the center of the circle containing , is perpendicular to the segment .   So, the lines joining the centers of the circles also intersect at 60° angles.  Therefore, the centers of the circles form an equilateral triangle. This is known as Napoleon's Theorem.

Location of the Fermat point

Traditional geometry

Given any Euclidean triangle  and an arbitrary point  let  The aim of this section is to identify a point  such that  for all  If such a point exists then it will be the Fermat point. In what follows  will denote the points inside the triangle and will be taken to include its boundary .

A key result that will be used is the dogleg rule, which asserts that if a triangle and a polygon have one side in common and the rest of the triangle lies inside the polygon then the triangle has a shorter perimeter than the polygon:
If  is the common side, extend  to cut the polygon at the point . Then the polygon's perimeter is, by the triangle inequality:

Let  be any point outside . Associate each vertex with its remote zone; that is, the half-plane beyond the (extended) opposite side. These 3 zones cover the entire plane except for  itself and  clearly lies in either one or two of them. So for every point  outside  there exists a point  in  such that 

Case 1.    The triangle has an angle ≥ 120°.

Then the triangle  is a 60° rotation of the triangle  about  so these two triangles are congruent and it follows that  which is simply the length of the path . As  is constrained to lie within , by the dogleg rule the length of this path exceeds  Therefore,  for all  Now allow  to range outside . From above a point  exists such that  and as  it follows that  for all  outside . In other words, the Fermat point lies at the obtuse-angled vertex.

Case 2.    The triangle has no angle ≥ 120°.

Construct the equilateral triangle , let  be any point inside , and construct the equilateral triangle . Then  is a 60° rotation of  about  so 
 
which is simply the length of the path . Let  be the point where  and  intersect. This point is commonly called the first isogonic center. By the angular restriction  lies inside . From above a point  exists such that  and as  it follows that  for all  outside . In other words, the Fermat point is coincident with the first isogonic center.

Vector analysis
Let  be any five points in a plane. Denote the vectors  by  respectively, and let  be the unit vectors from  along .

 
Adding  gives 

 
for all . In other words, 

This argument fails when the triangle has an angle  because there is no point  where  meet at angles of 120°. Nevertheless, it is easily fixed by redefining  and placing  at  so that . Since 
 
the third inequality still holds, the other two inequalities are unchanged.

Lagrange multipliers
Another approach to finding the point within a triangle, from which the sum of the distances to the vertices of the triangle is minimal, is to use one of the mathematical optimization methods; specifically, the method of Lagrange multipliers and the law of cosines.

We draw lines from the point within the triangle to its vertices and call them . Also, let the lengths of these lines be  respectively. Using the method of Lagrange multipliers we have to find the minimum of the Lagrangian , which is expressed as:

where  are the lengths of the sides of the triangle.

Equating each of the five partial derivatives  to zero and eliminating  eventually gives  and  so . However the elimination is a long and tedious business, and the end result covers only Case 2.

Properties 

 When the largest angle of the triangle is not larger than 120°, X(13) is the Fermat point.
 The angles subtended by the sides of the triangle at X(13) are all equal to 120° (Case 2), or 60°, 60°, 120° (Case 1).
 The circumcircles of the three constructed equilateral triangles are concurrent at X(13).
 Trilinear coordinates for the first isogonic center, X(13):

 Trilinear coordinates for the second isogonic center, X(14):

 Trilinear coordinates for the Fermat point:

 where  respectively denote the Boolean variables .
 The isogonal conjugate of X(13) is the first isodynamic point, X(15):

 The isogonal conjugate of X(14) is the second isodynamic point, X(16):

 The following triangles are equilateral:
antipedal triangle of X(13)
Antipedal triangle of X(14)
Pedal triangle of X(15)
Pedal triangle of X(16)
Circumcevian triangle of X(15)
Circumcevian triangle of X(16)
 The lines X(13)X(15) and X(14)X(16) are parallel to the Euler line.  The three lines meet at the Euler infinity point, X(30).
 The points X(13), X(14), the circumcenter, and the nine-point center lie on a Lester circle.
 The line X(13)X(14) meets the Euler line at midpoint of X(2) and X(4).
 The Fermat point lies in the open orthocentroidal disk punctured at its own center, and could be any point therein.

Aliases 
The isogonic centers X(13) and X(14) are also known as the first Fermat point and the second Fermat point respectively. Alternatives are the positive Fermat point and the negative Fermat point. However these different names can be confusing and are perhaps best avoided. The problem is that much of the literature blurs the distinction between the Fermat point and the first Fermat point whereas it is only in Case 2 above that they are actually the same.

History 
This question was proposed by Fermat, as a challenge to Evangelista Torricelli. He solved the problem in a similar way to Fermat's, albeit using the intersection of the circumcircles of the three regular triangles instead. His pupil, Viviani, published the solution in 1659.

See also
Geometric median or Fermat–Weber point, the point minimizing the sum of distances to more than three given points.
Lester's theorem
Triangle center
Napoleon points
Weber problem

References

External links 
 
 Fermat Point by Chris Boucher, The Wolfram Demonstrations Project.
 Fermat-Torricelli generalization at Dynamic Geometry Sketches Interactive sketch generalizes the Fermat-Torricelli point.
 A practical example of the Fermat point
 iOS Interactive sketch

Triangle centers
Articles containing proofs